Procambarus nigrocinctus, the blackbelted crayfish, is a species of crayfish in the family Cambaridae. It is listed as a species of Least Concern on the IUCN Red List, because it is known from more than 100 sites across thirteen counties in Texas, where it is endemic to the Neches River system, and is common and widespread in a national park.

References

External links

Cambaridae
Endemic fauna of Texas
Freshwater crustaceans of North America
Crustaceans described in 1990
Taxonomy articles created by Polbot
Taxa named by Horton H. Hobbs Jr.